Philip James Harding (born 1957) is an English music producer, audio engineer, remixer, academic and author.  

Harding started in the music industry aged 16 at London's Marquee Studios in 1973, where he got to work as an assistant engineer under the guidance of top producers on albums for artists such as Elton John, Kiki Dee and Barry Blue. As Harding's career progressed, a long list of credits began to accumulate, with artists as diverse as The Clash, Killing Joke, Toyah Willcox, Amii Stewart and Matt Bianco, all taking advantage of Harding's fast-growing reputation as a top engineer. The very first band Harding worked with was Killing Joke where he was a young in-house engineer.

By 1984, a newly formed production team at The Marquee – Stock Aitken Waterman – was added to the list. Harding engineered and mixed their first chart successes, Divine and Hazell Dean, and their breakthrough international hit and first No. 1 single, Dead Or Alive's "You Spin Me Round (Like a Record)". Moving across to the PWL Studios in London, 'The Hit Factory', their success was unstoppable – for artists such as Rick Astley, Mel & Kim, Bananarama, Pet Shop Boys and Kylie Minogue. Harding's partnership (from 1986) with Ian Curnow in the basement studio of PWL saw them become internationally renowned remixers/producers, with multiple UK and American singles and club chart successes for a list of artists, including Diana Ross, Depeche Mode, The Jackson 5, Erasure, The Four Tops, Five Star, Chic, Jesus Jones, John Travolta & Olivia Newton-John, ABC, Imagination, Climie Fisher, Donna Summer, Voice of the Beehive and Debbie Harry.

In 1992, Harding left PWL to set up his own production company, P&E Music, with Ian Curnow at The Strongroom studio complex in London. A further list of hits followed as producers and industry 'go-to' remixers. Even when occasionally working under a number of new aliases such as CHAPS and Power Syndicate, success came for artists such as East 17 (including 1994 Christmas No. 1, "Stay Another Day"), Deuce, 911, Caught in the Act, Let Loose and Boyzone (including the 1996 No.1 single, "Words"). 

Since the 2000s, Harding became closely involved in music education and was appointed co-chair of JAMES (Joint Audio Media Education Support), involved in masterclasses, accreditations and course planning; as well as being a director of the MPG (Music Producers Guild).

During the last decade, Harding has worked with Lamont Dozier in Los Angeles mixing Cliff Richard's Soulicious album, published the book, PWL From The Factory Floor with an accompanying Phil Harding Club Mixes of the 80s' CD. In 2017, he completed a PhD doctorate in Music Production at Leeds Beckett University. 

Harding's current music production team, PJS Music Productions (with Julian Wiggins and Simon Dalton), has recently completed projects for Holly Johnson, Belinda Carlisle, Samantha Fox, Curiosity Killed The Cat and Mel & Kim. 

In 2019, Harding's book Pop Music Production was published (in the Routledge Press academic series, 'Perspectives on Music Production'), which examines the pop music culture, business, songwriting and production processes around his work in the 1990s. 

2020 has seen Harding embark on a tour of University lectures around the UK, star in an 'In Conversation With...' event and feature in further radio, TV and press interviews.

Harding's first academic journal paper was published in the "Journal of Music, Technology & Education" (Volume 13, Numbers 2-3, 1 December 2021), entitled "Pop vs Rock: A comparison study of managing sessions in the recording studio and the influences of genre", co-authored with Nyssim Lefford.

Artists Harding has worked with 
 

911
ABC
Amii Stewart
Bananarama
Band Aid II
Basia
Belinda Carlisle
Blue Mercedes
Brother Beyond
Boyzone
Chic
Cliff Richard
Diana Ross
Climie Fisher
Curiosity Killed The Cat
Dead Or Alive
Debbie Gibson
Debbie Harry
Depeche Mode
Deuce
Divine
Dollar
Donna Summer
Dusty Springfield
East 17
Eighth Wonder
Erasure
Five Star
Gary Moore
Gina G
Godley & Creme
Hazell Dean
Holly Johnson
Imagination
Jason Donovan
Jermaine Stewart
Jesus Jones
Jimmy Ruffin
Jimmy Somerville
John Travolta & Olivia Newton-John
Kavana
Killing Joke
Kim Appleby
Kissing the Pink
Kylie Minogue
Let Loose
Lisa Barbuscia
Liberty X
Lonnie Gordon
Matt Bianco
Mel & Kim
Nik Kershaw
Nitzer Ebb
OTT
Pepsi & Shirlie
Pet Shop Boys
Peter Andre
Princess
Rick Astley
Roger Daltrey
Roxette
Samantha Fox
Sinitta
Sonia
Sybil
Take That
The Belle Stars
The Blow Monkeys
The Clash
The Cool Notes
The Four Tops
The Jackson Five
The Three Degrees
Thelma Houston
Toyah Willcox
T'Pau
Tracey Ullman
2wo Third3
Ultra
Voice of the Beehive
Worlds Apart

References

Bibliography

External links
 philhardingmusic.com – Official website
 pwlfromthefactoryfloor.com – Official website of Phil Harding's book PWL from the Factory Floor – Expanded Edition and CD Phil Harding Club Mixes of the 80s
  PWL Associates fansite
 Biography and video interviews at RecordProduction.com
 Producer's View – Phil Harding at Record-Producer.com
 
 

1957 births
Living people
English audio engineers
Remixers
English record producers
Alumni of Leeds Beckett University